Bill Pannbacker is an American politician who served as a member of the Kansas House of Representatives for the 106th district from 2019 to 2021. Pannbacker is also a farmer and stockman. Pannbacker did not seek re-election in 2020 and left office after a single term in January 2021.

Pannbacker is a resident of Washington, Kansas.

References 

Living people
Republican Party members of the Kansas House of Representatives
People from Washington County, Kansas
Year of birth missing (living people)
21st-century American politicians